Delony or DeLony is a surname. Notable people with the surname include:

Eric DeLony (1944–2018), American historic preservationist
Jenny Eakin Delony (1866–1949), American painter and educator

See also
Delany